Blautia obeum is a species of anaerobic, gram-positive bacteria found in the gut.

It has been shown that B. obeum along with other relevant taxa play an important role both in the recovery process from Vibrio cholerae infection and microbiota maturation in children. Moreover, experiments in model mice show that B. obeum strain AI-2 reduces the pathogenicity of V. cholerae. The data show that the expression of quorum sensing autoinducers by B. obeum is increased in V. cholera infections and they repress the expression of several V. cholera virulence factors.

References

External links
Type strain of Blautia obeum at BacDive -  the Bacterial Diversity Metadatabase

Lachnospiraceae
Gut flora bacteria
Bacteria described in 1976